Zurich is a live performance album by Borbetomagus, released in 1984 by Agaric Records.

Track listing

Personnel 
Adapted from Zurich liner notes.

Borbetomagus
 Don Dietrich – tenor saxophone, alto saxophone, electric guitar (B4)
 Donald Miller – electric guitar, alto saxophone (B4), cover art
 Jim Sauter – baritone saxophone, alto saxophone, tenor saxophone, electric guitar

Production and additional personnel
 Gary Solomon – engineering
 Mike Smirnoff – cover art

Release history

References

External links 
 

1984 live albums
Borbetomagus albums